This electoral calendar for the year 2001 lists the national/federal direct elections to be held in 2001 in the de jure and de facto sovereign states. By-elections are excluded, though national referendums are included.

January
14 January:
 Portugal, President
 Cape Verde, Parliament
 Ivory Coast, Parliament (26 seats had postponed declarations)

February

 11 February: Cape Verde, President

March
 2 March: Samoa, Legislative Assembly
 4 March:
 Andorra, Parliament
 Elections in Benin, President
 12 March: Elections in Uganda, President

April

 29 April: Senegal, Parliament

May
13 May: Italy, Parliament
20 May: Chad, President

June
7 June: United Kingdom, Parliament
7 June: United Kingdom, Local
24 June: Albania, Parliament (first round)
26 June: Uganda, Parliament

July
8 July: Albania, Parliament (second round)
29 July: São Tomé and Príncipe, President

August

 31 August to 2 September: Seychelles, President

September
9-10 September: Norway, Parliament
23 September: Poland, Parliament

October
14 October: Argentina, Parliament
18 October: The Gambia, President
19 and 26 October: Mauritania, Parliament

November
20 November: Denmark, Parliament
25 November: Honduras, President and Parliament

December
 Chile: Parliament (16 December)
 Madagascar: President (16 December)
 Gabon: Parliament (9 and 23 December)
 Zambia: President and Parliament (27 December)

Unknown

References

 
Political timelines of the 2000s by year